Hodikof Island (52°52'N 173°18'E) is a tiny  satellite of Attu Island in the Near Islands at the extreme western end of the Aleutian Islands, Alaska.  Its name is derived from Hodikof Point, and it lies in Sarana Bay on the east side of Attu.  The seaward extension of Hodikof Island is known as Hodikof Reef.

References

Near Islands
Islands of Alaska
Islands of Unorganized Borough, Alaska